Police Academy: The Series (or Police Academy: The Animated Series), is an American animated series produced by Ruby-Spears Enterprises in association with Warner Bros. Television and made by Toei Animation, which was based on the franchise of the same name. Originally aired in syndication from September 10, 1988 from September 2, 1989, it was composed by 65 episodes divided into two seasons. Below is the list of episodes.

List

Season 1 (1988)

Season 2 (1988-89)

References

Police Academy
Police Academy (franchise)